Oberon Council is a local government area in the Central West region of New South Wales, Australia.

The Mayor of Oberon Council is Cr. Mark Kellam, an independent politician.

Localities
Oberon Council includes the towns / villages of Oberon, Black Springs, Shooters Hill, Edith, O'Connell, Hazelgrove, Mount David, Jenolan and Burraga. It also includes the minor localities of Arkstone, Duckmaloi, Essington, Isabella and Porters Retreat.

Heritage listings
The Oberon Council has a number of heritage-listed sites, including:
Jenolan Caves Road: Jenolan Caves
Lindlegreen Barn O'Connell
O'Connell Hotel
6 Foot Track.
Yerranderie.
 Oberon, 124 Oberon Street: Malachi Gilmore Memorial Hall
Ramsgate Cottage.
 Oberon, Tarana-Oberon railway: Oberon railway station

Demographics 

According to the Australian Bureau of Statistics there:
 were 5,503 people as at 30 June 2006, the 125th largest Local Government Area in New South Wales.  It was equal to less than 0.1% of the New South Wales population of 6,827,694
 was an increase of 60 people over the year to 30 June 2006, the 99th largest population growth in a Local Government Area in New South Wales.  It was equal to 0.1% of the 58,753 increase in the population of New South Wales
 was, in percentage terms, an increase of 1.1% in the number of people over the year to 30 June 2006, the 41st fastest growth in population of a Local Government Area in New South Wales.  In New South Wales the population grew by 0.9%
 was an increase in population over the 10 years to 30 June 2006 of 648 people or 13% (1.3% in annual average terms), the 32nd highest rate of a Local Government Area in New South Wales.  In New South Wales the population grew by 622,966 or 10% (1.0% in annual average terms) over the same period.

Council

Current composition and election method
Oberon Council is composed of nine councillors elected proportionally as a single ward. All councillors are elected for a fixed term of office. The mayor is elected by the councillors at the first meeting of the council for a 2-year term. The most recent election was held on 4 December 2021. The makeup of the council is as follows:

The current Council, elected in 2022, in order of result is:

References 

 
Local government areas of New South Wales